Got Talent España, is the Spanish version of the international Got Talent series. It is hosted by Santi Millán and broadcast on Spanish Telecinco channel. The idea behind the programme is to search for the most talented and promising entertainment. The series premiered on 13 February 2016. The new show is a continuation of an original series Tienes Talento that had seen one season starting 25 January 2008 on Cuatro, hosted by Nuria Roca and Eduardo Aldán and was discontinued after one season. On 15 June 2015, Mediaset España announced the revival of the series for the group's main channel Telecinco. The judges were Edurne, Eva Hache, Jesús Vázquez, and Jorge Javier Vázquez.

Tienes Talento 

The original series was hosted by Nuria Roca (also the host of Factor X), with Eduardo Aldán as backstage host. Actress Natalia Millán, music conductor Josep Vicent, and singer-songwriter David Summers were the three original judges. Summers appeared only in the first episode and left the show prematurely due to pneumonia; he was replaced by singer and musician Miqui Puig (also a judge on Factor X) for the rest of the season. On 21 April 2008, 16-year-old flamenco singer Salva Rodríguez won the finale with 23 percent of the televote.

Got Talent España seasons

Summary

Seasons 1 (2016)
Telecinco opened auditions for Got Talent España on 15 June 2015. On 5 August 2015, Telecinco announced the panel of judges: television presenter Jesús Vázquez; television presenter Jorge Javier Vázquez; actress, comedian and television presenter Eva Hache; and singer, actress and television presenter Edurne. On 26 August 2015, actor and showman Santi Millán was announced as host. The series premiered on 13 February 2016. On 27 April 2016, versatile opera and rock music singer Cristina Ramos Pérez won the finale of the season. The pianist Alberto de Paz was runner-up and singer María Mendoza came third. There were also participations from other countries including Brazil, China, Cuba, Dominican Republic, Italy and the Philippines.

Host and judges

Finalists

Season 2 (2017)
On 23 April 2016, Telecinco renewed the series for another season. On 27 July 2016, it was announced that publicist and media personality Risto Mejide would be a judge on the second season. It was later confirmed that Mejide would be replacing Jesús Vázquez. The series premiered on 21 January 2017. On 22 March 2017, rock and roll dancer Antonio Garrido "El Tekila" won the season finale. The dancer Samuel Martí Pérez was runner-up. There were also participations from Algeria, Argentina and Cuba.

Host and judges

Finalists

Season 3 (2018)
The third season premiered on 17 January 2018. On 11 April 2018, poet César Brandon from Equatorial Guinea won the season finale. This was the first time in the history of the show that a non-Spaniard won the title. The Spanish taekwondo show band Taekwondo Tao were runners-up.

Host and judges

Season 4 (2019)
The fourth season premiered on 28 January 2019. On 27 July 2018, it was announced that actress Eva Isanta would replace Eva Hache in the panel. On 3 September 2018, it was announced that comedian, actress and television presenter Paz Padilla would replace Jorge Javier Vázquez in the panel. On 29 April 2019, the murga group Murga Zeta Zetas won the season finale.

Season 5 (2019) 
The fifth season premiered on 16 September 2019, less than five months after the finale of the fourth season. On 11 June 2019, it was announced that comedian and television presenter Dani Martínez would replace Eva Isanta in the panel. On 16 December 2019, 3-year-old drummer Hugo Molina won the season finale, becoming the second youngest winner to date in any of the Got Talent franchises; the youngest winner being Arinka Shuhalevych from Ukraine in the 2016 Kid's Version.

Season 6 (2021) 
The sixth season premiered on 15 January 2021. Paz Padilla was only present for the semi-final and final, due to the death of her husband. On 30 April 2021, ventriloquist Celia Muñoz won the season finale.

Season 7 (2021) 
The seventh season featured three judges instead of four, after the exit of Paz Padilla. It premiered on 10 September 2021. Acrobats Dúo Turkeev won the finale on 17 December 2021.

Season 8 (2022) 
The eighth season of Got Talent España premiered on 5 September 2022. Paula Echevarría joined as judge, completing a panel of four judges again.

References 

Spain
Television series by Fremantle (company)
2010s Spanish television series
2016 Spanish television series debuts
Spanish reality television series
Spanish music television series
Telecinco original programming
Spanish television series based on British television series